Middleton is a town in the Metropolitan Borough of Rochdale, Greater Manchester, England, and it is unparished.  The town and the surrounding countryside contain 45 listed buildings that are recorded in the National Heritage List for England.  Of these, one is listed at Grade I, the highest of the three grades, seven are at Grade II*, the middle grade, and the others are at Grade II, the lowest grade.  Until the coming of the Industrial Revolution Middleton was a village, then came the industries of silk, cotton and coal.  The oldest listed buildings consist of a church and vicarage, country houses, a school, a public house, and a bridge.  The Rochdale Canal passes through the area, and locks and a bridge on it are listed.  The later listed buildings include more churches, houses and schools, a drinking fountain, a bank, a club, a cotton mill, a park feature, and war memorials.  The architect Edgar Wood lived in the town and he, sometimes with his partner Henry Sellars, designed some of the later listed buildings.



Key

Buildings

References

Citations

Sources

Lists of listed buildings in Greater Manchester
Buildings and structures in the Metropolitan Borough of Rochdale
Listed